The 1961–62 Polska Liga Hokejowa season was the 27th season of the Polska Liga Hokejowa, the top level of ice hockey in Poland. Six teams participated in the league, and Gornik Katowice won the championship.

Regular season

External links
 Season on hockeyarchives.info

Polska
Polska Hokej Liga seasons
1961–62 in Polish ice hockey